The 2001–02 Irish League Cup (known as the CIS Insurance Cup for sponsorship reasons) was the 16th edition of Northern Ireland's secondary football knock-out cup competition. It concluded on 27 November 2001 with the final.

Glentoran were the defending champions after their third League Cup win last season; a 1–0 victory over Glenavon in the previous final. This season they reached the final again but were defeated 3–1 by arch-rivals Linfield, who won their seventh League Cup overall, and fourth in five years. This was also the third time in five years that the two clubs had met in the final, with Linfield coming out on top on all three occasions.

The competition had a major reformat this season. The twenty clubs taking part were divided into four groups of five clubs based on region. The clubs in each group played each other once, either at home or away. The top two clubs from each group then advanced to the quarter-finals where they played a single knock-out tie against another quarter-finalist. The semi-finals were played in a home and away two-legged aggregate score format with the two winners of the ties advancing to the single match final.

Group stage

Eastern Region

Greater Belfast Region

Northern Region

Southern Region

Quarter-finals

Semi-finals

Final

References

Lea
2001–02 domestic association football cups
2001-02